Promicromonospora aerolata is a bacterium from the genus Promicromonospora which has been isolated from air from the Vergilius Chapel in Vienna, Austria.

References

Further reading

External links
Type strain of Promicromonospora aerolata at BacDive -  the Bacterial Diversity Metadatabase	

Micrococcales
Bacteria described in 2003